The women's long jump event at the 1994 World Junior Championships in Athletics was held in Lisbon, Portugal, at Estádio Universitário de Lisboa on 22 and 23 July.

Medalists

Results

Final
23 July

Qualifications
22 Jul

Group A

Group B

Participation
According to an unofficial count, 25 athletes from 19 countries participated in the event.

References

Long jump
Long jump at the World Athletics U20 Championships